Wavula Pane is a cave located in  Bulutota Rakwana range, northwest of Embilipitiya one of the archeological site located in Sri Lanka. 
The meaning of Wavul Pane (Sinhalese name) is Cave of Bats. Approximately more than 250,000 bats inhabit it.

See also
 Balangoda Man

References
 Kenneth A. R. Kennedy, "Fa Hien Cave", in Encyclopedia of Anthropology ed. H. James Birx (2006, SAGE Publications)
 "Pre- and Protohistoric settlement in Sri Lanka" — S. U. Deraniyagala, Director-General of Archaeology, Sri Lanka
 Kenneth A. R. Kennedy and Siran U. Deraniyagala, Fossil remains of 28,000-year old hominids from Sri Lanka, Current Anthropology, Vol. 30, No. 3. (Jun., 1989), pp. 394–399.
 Kenneth A. R. Kennedy, T. Disotell, W. J. Roertgen, J. Chiment and J. Sherry, Biological anthropology of upper Pleistocene hominids from Sri Lanka: Batadomba Lena and Beli Lena caves, Ancient Ceylon 6: 165–265.
 Kenneth A. R. Kennedy, Siran U. Deraniyagala, W. J. Roertgen, J. Chiment and T. Disotell, Upper Pleistocene fossil hominids from Sri Lanka, American Journal of Physical Anthropology, 72: 441–461, 1987.
 Dr. Deraniyagala
 Annual Review of Anthropology: 1980 By Bernard J. Siegel - Page 403 & 416
 [1] Propaedia: outline of knowledge and guide to the Britannica.--[2]-[11] Micropaedia: ready reference and index.--[12]-[30] Macropaedia: knowledge in depth.
 Professor Paul Mellars

External links
 Cave exploration tours in Sri Lanka
 PRE- AND PROTOHISTORIC SETTLEMENT IN SRI LANKA
 Pahiyangala (Fa-Hiengala) Caves
 Prehistoric basis for the rise of civilisation in Sri Lanka and southern India
 Here they lived and died
 http://townplanninginsrilanka.blogspot.com/2008/05/pre-and-protohistoric-settlement-in-sri.html PRE - AND PROTOHISTORIC SETTLEMENT IN SRI LANKA
ABSTRACT

Archaeological sites in Sri Lanka
Cenozoic paleontological sites of Asia